Behavior Genetics is a peer-reviewed scientific journal published monthly by Springer Science+Business Media that is covering "research in the inheritance of behavior". It is the official journal of the Behavior Genetics Association. The journal was established in 1971 with Steven G. Vandenberg as its founding editor-in-chief. The abstracts of the annual meetings are printed in the journal. Each year, the editorial board chooses a particularly meritorious paper in the previous year's volume of the journal for the Fulker Award, acknowledged by "$1000 and a good bottle of wine" as well as a citation made in the journal. This award was created in the honor of David Fulker, a past president of the Behavior Genetics Association (1982) and former editor-in-chief of the journal.

Abstracting and indexing 
The journal is abstracted in Biological Abstracts/BIOSIS Previews, CAB Abstracts, Current Awareness in Biological Sciences, Current Contents/Social & Behavioral Sciences and Life Sciences, EMBASE, PsycINFO, PubMed/MEDLINE, Science Citation Index, Scopus, Social Sciences Citation Index, and The Zoological Record. According to the Journal Citation Reports, the journal has a 2020 impact factor of 2.805.

References

External links 
 

Behavioural genetics journals
English-language journals
Publications established in 1971
Bimonthly journals
Springer Science+Business Media academic journals
Twin studies